Raharney is a village in east County Westmeath, Ireland. It has a population of 221 according to the 2016 census.

Public transport

Bus Éireann route 115A provides a commuter link to Dublin via Ballivor, Summerhill and Maynooth with one journey in the morning and an evening journey back Mondays to Fridays inclusive. Until August 2013, Bus Éireann route 118 provided a daily commuter service to Dublin and Mullingar.

Geography

The village of Raharney has a bridge over the River Deel and is the last settlement of the county on the edge of bogland that separates Westmeath from County Meath. The bridge links the roads that run north-south alongside the River Deel on one side and alongside the bog on the other (road from Delvin and on through Riverdale). The River Deel is a tributary of the Boyne. The roads into the village all slope down towards the river, suggesting that before the bridge was built there was a ford at this point. Looking westward to Mullingar the town is located in the gap between three large lakes. Raharney, therefore, lies on the route of a path of what probably was, in the past, difficult terrain through the midlands. The three east-west roads were the Athboy-Delvin-Mullingar road, the Clonard-Kinnegad-Athlone/Mullingar road and Trim-Raharney/Killucan-Mullingar road.

There is an old, unused graveyard, perched on top of a small hill on the bend of the river as it leaves the village. The village is also home to a Roman Catholic church which is dedicated to St. Mary.

Sport

Raharney Hurling Club is the local parish Gaelic Athletic Association club, and has won the Westmeath Senior Hurling Championship on thirteen occasions. The club's camogie team has won the Westmeath camogie final several times.

See also
List of towns and villages in Ireland

References

Towns and villages in County Westmeath